Bogdani is an Albanian surname meaning 'son of Bogdan comes from Serbian decent '. It is of Slavic origin. Bogdan in Slavic means "God-given". It may refer to these people:

Erjon Bogdani, Albanian footballer
Pjetër Bogdani, Albanian writer
Jakob Bogdani, Hungarian painter who Anglicized his original last name Bogdány to Bogdani 
Andrea Bogdani, Ottoman scholar of Albanian origin and prelate of the Roman Catholic Church.
Llukë Bogdani, Ottoman poet of slavic origin. 
Gerti Bogdani, Albanian politician.

See also 
 Bogdan, Bohdan
 Bogdanov
 Bogdany (disambiguation)

Albanian-language surnames
Patronymic surnames
Theophoric names